The 2019 WNBA season was the 23rd season for the New York Liberty franchise of the WNBA. The Liberty opened the regular season at home on May 24 versus the Indiana Fever.

The Liberty started slowly, losing their first four games of the season.  Winning five of their next eight games took them to a 5–7 record at the end of June.  The team had plenty of reasons to be positive, as three of those five wins came against eventual playoff teams.  The Liberty won their first two games in July to put together a four game win streak and reach a .500 record.  However, they could not keep their momentum, losing three of their last four games in July.  August proved a difficult month as the team only won one game.  A seven game losing streak and a six game losing streak saw the team go into the final game with the Atlanta Dream with a 9–24 record.  The Dream entered with 8–25 record, meaning if the Dream won, the teams would tie for the worst record in the WNBA.  The Liberty won by seven points to end their season on a high note.  Their ten wins is the second lowest in franchise history, with the only worse season being 2018 where they had only seven wins.

After the season, it was announced that head coach Katie Smith's contract would not be renewed.

Transactions

WNBA Draft

Trades/Roster Changes

Current roster

Game log

Pre-season

|- style="background:#bbffbb;"
| 1
| May 9
| China
| W 89–71
| Tied (19)
| Warley-Talbert (8)
| Boyd (4)
| Barclays Center4,115
| 1–0
|- style="background:#fcc;"
| 2
| May 13
| @ Connecticut Sun
| L 66–100
| Charles (11)
| Charles (5)
| Wright (4)
| Mohegan Sun Arena3,806
| 1–1
|- style="background:#fcc;"
| 3
| May 14
| vs. Atlanta Dream
| L 87–92
| Zahui B. (20)
| Zahui B. (8)
| Tied (4)
| Mohegan Sun Arena3,458
| 1–2
|- style="background:#fcc;"
| 4
| May 19
| vs. Connecticut Sun
| L 79–98
| Nurse (25)
| Charles (6)
| 5 tied (2)
| Times Union Center
| 1–3

Regular season

|- style="background:#fcc;"
| 1
| May 24
| Indiana Fever
| L 80–81
| Charles (32)
| Charles (12)
| Hartley (4)
| Westchester County Center1,965
| 0–1

|- style="background:#fcc;"
| 2
| June 1
| @ Indiana Fever
| L 77–92
| Charles (15)
| Gray (9)
| Boyd (6)
| Bankers Life Fieldhouse5,003
| 0–2
|- style="background:#fcc;"
| 3
| June 4
| Los Angeles Sparks
| L 73–78
| Charles (21)
| Charles (14)
| Boyd (6)
| Westchester County Center3,579
| 0–3
|- style="background:#fcc;"
| 4
| June 7
| Washington Mystics
| L 85–94
| Charles (27)
| Zahui B. (7)
| Tied (5)
| Westchester County Center1,567
| 0–4
|- style="background:#bbffbb;"
| 5
| June 9
| Las Vegas Aces
| W 88–78
| Charles (21)
| Zahui B. (9)
| Hartley (6)
| Westchester County Center1,447
| 1–4
|- style="background:#bbffbb;"
| 6
| June 12
| Minnesota Lynx
| W 75–69
| Nurse (26)
| Zahui B. (13)
| Boyd (7)
| Westchester County Center1,181
| 2–4
|- style="background:#fcc;"
| 7
| June 14
| @ Las Vegas Aces
| L 65–100
| Nurse (12)
| Gray (5)
| Boyd (5)
| Mandalay Bay Events Center4,110
| 2–5
|- style="background:#bbffbb;"
| 8
| June 15
| @ Los Angeles Sparks
| W 98–92
| Zahui B. (37)
| Charles (13)
| Boyd (12)
| Staples Center11,388
| 3–5
|- style="background:#fcc;"
| 9
| June 19
| Chicago Sky
| L 83–91
| Durr (19)
| Zahui B. (10)
| Boyd (7)
| Westchester County Center1,585
| 3–6
|- style="background:#fcc;"
| 10
| June 22
| @ Minnesota Lynx
| L 83–92
| Nurse (24)
| Charles (9)
| Boyd (8)
| Target Center8,600
| 3–7
|- style="background:#bbffbb;"
| 11
| June 28
| Dallas Wings
| W 69–68
| Nurse (17)
| Gray (11)
| Boyd (7)
| Westchester County Center2,191
| 4–7
|- style="background:#bbffbb;"
| 12
| June 30
| @ Atlanta Dream
| W 74–58
| Charles (24)
| Gray (15)
| 3 tied (4)
| State Farm Arena4,359
| 5–7

|- style="background:#bbffbb;"
| 13
| July 3
| @ Seattle Storm
| W 84–83
| Charles (26)
| Gray (8)
| Boyd (10)
| Alaska Airlines Arena8,710
| 6–7
|- style="background:#bbffbb;"
| 14
| July 5
| @ Phoenix Mercury
| W 80–76
| Nurse (26)
| Charles (12)
| Boyd (6)
| Talking Stick Resort Arena9,560
| 7–7
|- style="background:#fcc;"
| 15
| July 7
| Las Vegas Aces
| L 58–90
| Charles (13)
| Charles (8)
| Wright (5)
| Westchester County Center1,971
| 7–8
|- style="background:#fcc;"
| 16
| July 12
| @ Chicago Sky
| L 83–99
| Nurse (18)
| Gray (6)
| Tied (5)
| Wintrust Arena7,221
| 7–9
|- style="background:#fcc;"
| 17
| July 14
| @ Seattle Storm
| L 69–78
| Nurse (19)
| Zahui B. (8)
| Hartley (5)
| Alaska Airlines Arena6,733
| 7–10
|- style="background:#bbffbb;"
| 18
| July 20
| Los Angeles Sparks
| W 83–78
| Johannès (17)
| Gray (8)
| Boyd (6)
| Westchester County Center2,195
| 8–10
|- style="background:#fcc;"
| 19
| July 24
| @ Connecticut Sun
| L 63–70
| Charles (13)
| Charles (11)
| Wright (5)
| Mohegan Sun Arena8,249
| 8–11

|- style="background:#fcc;"
| 20
| August 1 
| @ Dallas Wings
| L 64–87
| Nurse (13)
| Charles (5)
| Wright (4)
| College Park Center4,011
| 8–12
|- style="background:#fcc;"
| 21
| August 4
| Connecticut Sun
| L 79–94
| Charles (20)
| Charles (10)
| Zahui B. (5)
| Westchester County Center1,927
| 8–13
|- style="background:#fcc;"
| 22
| August 7
| @ Chicago Sky
| L 92–101
| Charles (24)
| Zahui B. (9)
| Tied (7)
| Wintrust Arena5,797
| 8–14
|- style="background:#fcc;"
| 23
| August 11
| Seattle Storm
| L 69–84
| Charles (22)
| Charles (8)
| Wright (7)
| Barclays Center7,715
| 8–15
|- style="background:#fcc;"
| 24
| August 13
| Minnesota Lynx
| L 73–89
| Allen (28)
| Charles (7)
| Boyd (7)
| Westchester County Center1,570
| 8–16
|- style="background:#fcc;"
| 25
| August 16
| @ Dallas Wings
| L 77–83
| Charles (25)
| Wright (9)
| Wright (7)
| College Park Center4,070
| 8–17
|- style="background:#fcc;"
| 26
| August 18
| @ Phoenix Mercury
| L 72–78
| Charles (23)
| Charles (13)
| Tied (5)
| Talking Stick Resort Arena9,145
| 8–18
|- style="background:#bbffbb;"
| 27
| August 20
| @ Indiana Fever
| W 82–76
| Charles (23)
| Charles (14)
| Tied (4)
| Bankers Life Fieldhouse5,340
| 9–18
|- style="background:#fcc;"
| 28
| August 23
| Atlanta Dream
| L 87–90
| Hartley (17)
| Charles (8)
| Wright (6)
| Westchester County Center1,831
| 9–19
|- style="background:#fcc;"
| 29
| August 25
| @ Washington Mystics
| L 72–101
| Nurse (24)
| Tied (5)
| Wright (4)
| St. Elizabeth's East Arena4,200
| 9–20
|- style="background:#fcc;"
| 30
| August 27 
| Phoenix Mercury
| L 82–95
| Tied (18)
| Tied (5)
| Nurse (6)
| Westchester County Center1,693
| 9–21
|- style="background:#fcc;"
| 31
| August 30
| Connecticut Sun
| L 84–94
| Johannès (21)
| Raincock-Ekunwe (7)
| Tied (6)
| Westchester County Center1,791
| 9–22

|- style="background:#fcc;"
| 32
| September 3
| Washington Mystics
| L 77–93
| Johannès (22)
| Raincock-Ekunwe (5)
| Charles (5)
| Westchester County Center1,558
| 9–23
|- style="background:#fcc;"
| 33
| September 6
| Indiana Fever
| L 81–86
| Charles (19)
| Charles (11)
| Tied (7)
| Westchester County Center2,301
| 9–24
|- style="background:#bbffbb;"
| 34
| September 8
| @ Atlanta Dream
| W 71–63
| Charles (14)
| Zahui B. (11)
| Charles (5)
| State Farm Arena5,495
| 10–24

Standings

Statistics

Regular season

Awards and honors

References

External links
The Official Site of the New York Liberty

New York Liberty seasons
New York Liberty